Gary Harkins (born 2 January 1985) is a Scottish professional footballer and coach who plays as a midfielder.

Having come through the youth academies at Celtic and Blackburn Rovers he would notably play in the Scottish Premiership for Kilmarnock, Dundee and St. Mirren. He also played in the English Football League for Huddersfield Town, Bury, Blackpool, Grimsby Town and  Oldham Athletic, and in the Scottish Football League for Partick Thistle, Ayr United, Greenock Morton, Queen of the South, Stenhousemuir and Forfar Athletic. While at Forfar, he would also perform the role of first team coach, and later assistant manager.

Playing career

Blackburn Rovers
Harkins started out as a schoolboy player with Celtic before joining Blackburn Rovers as a YTS player when he was sixteen years old. He was appointed a trainee at Ewood Park in August 2003 but although he appeared in the academy and reserve teams, he did not play a competitive first team game for the club. Harkins joined Huddersfield Town on loan in March 2004, where he made only three appearances before returning to Blackburn in June. The arrival of Mark Hughes as manager of Blackburn in September 2004 saw Harkins called up to play with the first team in a number of pre-season friendlies, with Hughes apparently seeing potential in his future as a central defender. He joined Bury in February 2005, for whom he played five times in a month-long spell, and in November 2005, Harkins joined Blackpool on loan for one month, where he made six appearances, scoring two goals.

Grimsby Town

In July 2006, Harkins joined Grimsby Town on a free transfer, signing a two-year contract. He made his debut on 5 August 2006 in the club's 3–2 victory over Boston United and made 20 appearances in total for Grimsby in the 2006–07 season. His spell at Grimsby was an unhappy one, with factors including homesickness and a falling-out with manager Alan Buckley (who joined the club in November 2006), and at the end of the 2006–07 season, Buckley allowed Harkins to look for another club. Instead, Harkins was released by the club several weeks later.

Partick Thistle (first spell)
Harkins then moved to his native Scotland, and after a trial signed a one-year contract with Scottish First Division club Partick Thistle in July 2007. While he started out at Thistle playing as a defender, his move into midfield let him play in a more attacking role. Harkins made 39 appearances in the 2007–08 season, scoring three goals, and signed a one-year contract with the club in April 2008. In the 2008–09 season, scoring 11 goals. he was Thistle's top goalscorer with 11 goals from 40 appearances, and was nominated for the First Division's Player of the Year award; he had been named the Scottish Football League Player of the Month for February 2009. At the end of the season, Harkins was offered a new contract with the club, but he reportedly rejected a deal, something that was denied by Ian McCall.

Dundee (first spell)
After a protracted effort in which they had two offers turned down, Dundee signed Harkins in July 2009 for a fee of £150,000 plus future fees. He made 42 appearances for Dundee in the 2009–10 season, scoring 17 goals, won the SFL Player of the Month for August 2009, and was nominated for Scotland's Player of the Year for the First Division. He also scored one of Dundee's goals as they won the 2009 Scottish Challenge Cup Final.

At the start of the 2010–11 season, Harkins was named captain after being given the armband by manager Gordon Chisholm. Having been appointed, Harkins said he would try his best to become a captain. He made a further 38 appearances, scoring five goals, in a troubled 2010–11 season for Dundee in which the club was penalised 25 points by the Scottish Football League in November 2010 after going into administration. Harkins admitted that seeing Dundee in administration was the darkest day of his career. At the end of the season, Harkins was nominated for SFL Player of the Year in the First Division.

Kilmarnock
In June 2011, Harkins left Dundee to sign for Kilmarnock for an undisclosed fee, exercising an option to leave agreed when Dundee went into administration in the previous November. He made his first appearance for the Ayrshire side on 24 July, in a 1–1 draw with Dundee United at Tannadice and scored his first goal for the club in a 5–0 win over Queen of the South in the Scottish League Cup 3rd round, only 90 seconds into the match. On 18 March, he played in the 2012 Scottish League Cup Final which Kilmarnock won after beating Celtic 1–0. Harkins found it difficult to reproduce the performances before his move to Kilmarnock, after sustaining to an ankle injury.

In the 2012–13 season, Harkins only scored two goals. During January 2013, it was reported that he could return to Dundee; this was initially denied by manager Kenny Shiels, who claimed that Harkins was "one of the best players in the SPL".

Dundee (second spell)
On 25 January 2013, it was confirmed that Harkins had rejoined Dundee for an undisclosed fee. As part of the deal, the two clubs agreed that he would not play when they met the following weekend at Dens Park. Harkins's first game after signing for the club on a permanent basis came on 30 January 2013, in a 1–0 loss against Hearts. Then, on 6 April 2013, the last game of the season before it split, he scored twice in a 2–0 win against his former club; however, Dundee were then relegated after a draw with Aberdeen on 5 May 2013. Following their relegation, Harkins said his future was uncertain as he wanted to play at the higher level and soon announced his departure, citing the club's failure to agree a change of ownership.

St Mirren
Harkins agreed a two-year contract with St Mirren in June 2013. His debut was the opening game of the season, in a 3–0 loss against Inverness Caledonian Thistle. In the next game, Harkins scored his first goal for the club, against former club Kilmarnock in a 1–1 draw. During the Fourth Round Replay of the Scottish Cup, Harkins scored his second goal in a 3–0 win over Queen of the South that ensured St Mirren would progress to the fifth round. Following the match, he vowed to keep his first team place. A few weeks later, Harkins was criticised by manager Danny Lennon for not "working hard enough off the ball to succeed at St Mirren".

Oldham Athletic (loan)
Following an unsuccessful spell at St Mirren, Harkins joined Oldham Athletic on loan until the end of season 2013–14. He scored his first goals for the club in a 5–4 win against Peterborough after coming back from 3–0 down at half–time. Harkins scored the first Oldham goal to make it 3–1, bundling the ball into the back of the net after a knockdown from Jonson Clarke-Harris, and was then was involved in all of Oldham's goals, excelling on the left hand side of the pitch; he scored his second of the game with a penalty to make it 4–4 in the closing minutes and then had the final say in the match, delivering the corner from which Genseric Kusunga scored to make it 5–4 in the 96th minute. Harkins deservedly won man of the match for his performance and he gained many plaudits post-match.

During his time at the club, Harkins became a fans' favourite. Upon the end of his loan and his return to his parent club he had made 24 appearances and scored 5 goals. After Harkins' loan spell at Oldham Athletic came to an end, St Mirren announced on 27 June 2014 that the midfielder had his contract with the club cancelled by mutual consent.

Dundee (third spell)
Harkins signed a two-year contract with Dundee in June 2014. He scored against Manchester City in a pre-season friendly which Dundee went on to win 2–0. He scored his first goal of his third spell at the club with a penalty as Dundee drew 1–1 with Kilmarnock on 9 August 2014. In a next game against Partick Thistle on 16 August 2014, Harkins took a penalty, only for it to be saved by Paul Gallacher; the match ended 1–1. In October 2014, Harkins scored two goals in two games against Aberdeen and Motherwell; his goal celebration against Motherwell went viral after he performed a wrestling move on teammate Jim McAlister, which met with approval from professional wrestler Randy Orton. Harkins then received a red card after a second bookable offense, in a 2–1 loss against Hamilton Academical on 13 December 2014. He scored his third goal of the season in a 3–3 draw against Aberdeen on 17 January 2015. Towards the end of the 2014–15 season, Harkins suffered a shin injury which saw him miss one game and a knee injury that caused him to miss eight matches. Despite the injuries, He made thirty-one appearances and scored four times in all competitions.

Ayr United
On 12 August 2016, it was confirmed that Harkins had signed a two-year contract as a player/coach with newly promoted Scottish Championship club Ayr United.

Greenock Morton
Having negotiated a release from his contract at Ayr United after only a year, in June 2017 Harkins subsequently signed a one-year deal for Scottish Championship side, Greenock Morton on 7 June 2017.

Queen of the South
On 9 May 2018, Harkins signed for Dumfries club Queen of the South, initially on a one-year contract. He made his debut in a 2-1 home defeat to Dundee United. On 24 December 2018, Harkins was released from his contract at the Doonhamers, after intimating that he no longer wanted to play for the club.

Partick Thistle (second spell)
Harkins signed for Partick Thistle for a second spell on an 18-month contract on 27 December 2018, three days after leaving Queen of the South. Harkins scored his first goal in his second spell at the Jags in a 4-1 win away at Stenhousemuir in the quarter final of the Scottish Challenge Cup. Harkins was then released by Partick on 29 January 2020 & became a free agent.

Stenhousemuir
In February 2020 Harkins signed a contract until the end of the 2019/20 season with League Two side Stenhousemuir. On 10 June 2020, Harkins announced his retirement from playing via Twitter.

Gartcairn Juniors 
Just over 3 weeks after announcing his retirement, Harkins returned to football after signing a deal to play with Gartcairn F. A. Juniors in the newly-established West of Scotland Football League. In December 2020, Harkins would leave Gartcairn without having played a competitive game for the club.

Coaching career

Forfar Athletic 
In June 2021, Harkins was appointed as the first team coach for Scottish League Two side Forfar Athletic underneath manager and former Dundee teammate Gary Irvine, as well as being registered as a player. Following Scott Robertson's departure from the Loons in June 2022, Harkins was also named as player-assistant manager. On 11 November 2022, following the sacking of Irvine and the hiring of new manager Ray McKinnon, Forfar announced that Harkins had departed the club.

Personal life
Harkins was born in Greenock and attended St Columba's High School, Gourock, where he played in a wide variety of positions and for various teams before signing for Blackburn Rovers. His brother, Paul is also a footballer, playing in Scottish League Two for Elgin City. In 2012, after a scan for ligament damage, Gary revealed that doctors had told him he had been playing with a broken ankle for four years.

Career statistics

Honours
Dundee
Scottish Challenge Cup: 2010

Kilmarnock
Scottish League Cup: 2012

References

External links

1985 births
Living people
Footballers from Greenock
Scottish footballers
Association football midfielders
English Football League players
Blackburn Rovers F.C. players
Huddersfield Town A.F.C. players
Bury F.C. players
Blackpool F.C. players
Grimsby Town F.C. players
Oldham Athletic A.F.C. players
Scottish Football League players
Partick Thistle F.C. players
Dundee F.C. players
Kilmarnock F.C. players
West of Scotland Football League players
St Mirren F.C. players
Ayr United F.C. players
Greenock Morton F.C. players
Queen of the South F.C. players
Stenhousemuir F.C. players
Scottish Premier League players
Scottish Professional Football League players
Gartcairn F. A. Juniors players
Forfar Athletic F.C. non-playing staff
Forfar Athletic F.C. players
Celtic F.C. players
Association football coaches